Federico Errázuriz may refer to:

Federico Errázuriz Zañartu (1825–1877), president of Chile from 1871 to 1876
Federico Errázuriz Echaurren (1850–1901), president of Chile from 1896 to 1901
Federico Errázuriz Regional Institute, an institute in Santa Cruz, Chile